Rumours of Glory may refer to:

 "Rumours of Glory", a song from Humans (Bruce Cockburn album) (1980)
 Rumours of Glory (book), an autobiography by Bruce Cockburn